Barera (also Bharera) is a village in Allahabad, Uttar Pradesh, India. It is located on the outskirts of Bijnor near New Delhi.

References

Villages in Allahabad district